The Tired Sounds of Stars of the Lid is the sixth studio album by ambient drone music group Stars of the Lid. It was released in late 2001 on the Kranky label, on two CDs and three LPs. The album features long minimal, droning compositions created from heavily treated guitar, horn, flute, piano, and other classical instruments.

The second track, "Requiem for Dying Mothers, Part 2", features a sample from the final scene of Andrei Tarkovsky's film Stalker, where the character Monkey pushes a glass across a table by way of telekinesis as a dog whines and a train whistle blows in the distance. The third track, "Down 3", contains a sample from the soundtrack to John Frankenheimer's 1966 film Seconds.

Critical reception

The Tired Sounds of Stars of the Lid was generally praised by critics. Thom Jurek, writing for AllMusic, stated:

The music review online magazine Pitchfork placed The Tired Sounds of Stars of the Lid at number 187 on its list of top 200 albums of the 2000s. In 2016, Pitchfork ranked the album number six on its list of the 50 best ambient albums of all time.

Track listing

References

2001 albums
Kranky albums
Stars of the Lid albums
Albums produced by Adam Wiltzie
Instrumental albums